Drafi is a residential settlement located in a semi-mountainous slopped region in the municipal unit of Pikermi, in the municipality Rafina–Pikermi, East Attica, Greece. It is situated east of Athens city center, on the slopes of the Penteliko Mountain. It was initially developed as a housing project for the Agricultural Worker Cooperarative "Pan" . It is bordering Pikermi, Dioni, Penteli, Anthousa and Pallini. 

Drafi is considered a middle-scale residential area, with many detached houses and luxury mansions. Its developmental stage peaked during 2000-2004, when large scale infrastructure works in East Attica, such as the new international airport in Spata, increased interest for new residences in the wider area. The road network is highly slopped and not fully developed, although Drafi offers a few wider roads than its neighbouring Dioni, such as Achaion St, connecting Drafi with Penteli and Anthousa. Drafi is also well connected towards the center of  Pikermi, through Elaionon St.

Drafi has faced wildfires multiple times in the past (considerable damages in 1995, 1998, 2009 and 2022).

References

 Drafi Newsletter
 Pallini-Drafi at EveryTrail

External links
 www.ntrafi.gr

Populated places in East Attica